The Dodge Omni (and the nearly identical Plymouth Horizon) is a subcompact car that was produced by Chrysler Corporation from the 1978 to 1990 model years. The first Chrysler model line produced with front-wheel drive, the Omni and Horizon were also the first front-wheel drive economy cars assembled in the United States. Marketed for eleven years with very few changes, around 2,500,000 Omnis and Horizons were built with the Plymouth badged versions more popular than the Dodge branded models.

The first (and only) world car designed by Chrysler, the model line originated from a design of Chrysler Europe (who developed the namesake Chrysler Horizon). While visually similar, the American Omni/Horizon would have extensive functional differences from its European counterpart.

From 1977 to 1990, Chrysler produced the Omni and Horizon at its Belvidere Assembly Plant facility (Belvidere, Illinois); from 1987 to 1989, the model line was built under contract by American Motors Corporation (AMC) at its own facility in Kenosha, Wisconsin. From 1987 to 1990, the model line was marketed alongside its successor, the Dodge Shadow/Plymouth Sundance hatchback sedan.

Development 

In 1974, Chrysler president Lynn Townsend sent an American management team to Chrysler Europe to find a suitable small-car design to market in the United States, ultimately rejecting a front-wheel drive compact (codenamed C6) as unsuitable to produce for the United States (the design was produced in Europe as the Chrysler Alpine). At the end of 1974, Chrysler Europe approved the final clay model design of a shorter wheelbase version (codenamed C2) as a subcompact in the 1.3 L engine range. The C2 project provided multinational Chrysler Europe with a single model line to replace the outdated Simca 1100 and the Hillman Avenger.  

The development of the Dodge Omni and Plymouth Horizon began life in 1975. Following the retirement of Townsend, Chrysler management decided to develop an American-market version of the C2 project, working in tandem with Chrysler Europe.  While one American design team sought to redevelop the body as a coupe, designers ultimately retained the five-door hatchback, favoring its European-style configuration (similar to the five-door Golf).  

At the time, Chrysler Europe was splitting design and engineering work between France (chassis, powertrain, and manufacturing) and the United Kingdom (body design and development). Alongside component design for European use, American designers developed the C2 project to comply with local standards.

As part of the dire financial situation of its parent company, Chrysler Europe was sold to PSA Peugeot Citroën in August 1978. As part of the sale, Peugeot phased out the Chrysler brand in Europe in favor of a revived Talbot marque; the rebranded Horizon continued production (nearly unchanged) through 1987.

The sale of Chrysler Europe ended further design work on the C2 project; at the time, the company was seeking to expand the model line to a four-door sedan and a shorter-wheelbase three-door hatchback.

Transition to American design 
During the mid-1970s, Chrysler held no presence of its own in the subcompact automobile segment. Following the unsuccessful introduction of the Plymouth Cricket (captive imports of the Hillman Avenger), the company shifted to the Dodge/Plymouth Colt (captive import of the Mitsubishi Lancer). 

At the time, the front-wheel drive layout was largely reserved for low-volume luxury cars (including the Cadillac Eldorado and Oldsmobile Toronado). By 1976, Honda (with the Civic and the Accord) and Volkswagen (with the Rabbit) became the first manufacturers to offer competitive front-wheel drive economy cars in the American market. To further develop the C2 project for the American market, Chrysler Corporation purchased nearly 100 Volkswagen Rabbits in the United States for the purposes of reverse engineering.    

At the end of 1977, the C2 project entered production in both Europe and North America, with Chrysler Europe sharing the Horizon nameplate (as the Chrysler-Simca Horizon) with the American Plymouth division.  While Chrysler had trailed the AMC Gremlin, Ford Pinto, and Chevrolet Vega to market by eight years, the $2,500 ($ in  dollars) Omni/Horizon provided the company an extensive headstart on its American competitors (which were released in 1981 and 1982, respectively) with the adoption of front-wheel drive, transverse-mount powertrains.  

Following the 1978 sale of Chrysler Europe, Chrysler Corporation retained the design rights to its version of the C2 project, continuing production in Illinois.

Model overview 
The Dodge Omni and Plymouth Horizon are five-door hatchbacks sold in North America. Introduced in January 1978, the model line was developed in tandem with Chrysler Europe, leading to the namesake Chrysler Horizon. Chrysler also sold multiple variants of the model line derived from the same chassis, including 2+2 coupes and coupe utility pickup trucks.

Produced nearly unchanged from the 1978 to the 1990 model years, Chrysler had beaten out Ford and General Motors to the market with a domestically-produced front-wheel drive car to challenge the VW Rabbit.

Chassis 

The Dodge Omni and Plymouth Horizon use the front-wheel drive Chrysler L platform on a 99.2-inch wheelbase (shared with its European namesake). Initially designed by Chrysler Europe, Chrysler Corporation made substantial changes to the suspension design for the American market. In contrast to the Chrysler Horizon, which has a front torsion bar suspension, the model line uses front MacPherson struts. While the rear suspension shares a semi-independent layout (coil springs, rear trailing arms), the Omni/Horizon was developed with its own suspension tuning.

The model line is equipped with power-assisted front disc brakes and rear drum brakes and a rack and pinion steering system.

Powertrain 
While sharing a transverse engine layout, the Dodge Omni and Plymouth Horizon diverge furthest from the Chrysler Horizon in its engine offerings. At the time, Chrysler did not have capability to supply four-cylinder engines for the North American market (of any type), and the Simca-designed 1.1 to 1.4 L engines were deemed insufficient in terms of output. Instead, Chrysler adopted a  1.7 L I4, sourced from Volkswagen in the United States with as Chrysler-designed intake manifold. At the time of introduction, only the CARB-certified version with an air pump and  had been available.

Chrysler's 2.2 L K-car engine appeared for the 1981 model year as an upmarket option to the Volkswagen engine, mated to a new four-speed manual with an overdrive fourth. For 1983, Chrysler introduced a Peugeot-supplied  1.6-liter Simca unit as a new base engine (requiring only an alternator to be added by Chrysler); the engine was paired with a manual transmission and the deletion of air conditioning. For 1987, the 1.6 was dropped, with the 2.2-liter becoming the standard engine offering. The 2.2 received fuel injection for 1988, accompanied by three additional horsepower. Latterly, the 2.2 L engine was paired to a 5-speed manual transmission or a 3-speed automatic.

Chrysler had planned on offering PSA's new 1.9-liter diesel in the Omni/Horizon for the 1984 model year. Thanks to the implosion of the diesel market in North America, this never saw the light of day – although the engine was used in the European Horizon. For 1985, Chrysler had planned to build a "fast-burn, high-swirl" 1.8-liter four for the Omni as well as K-cars, but these plans also stalled.

Body 

While sharing a visually similar appearance with its Chrysler Europe counterpart, the Omni/Horizon shares almost no body commonality. Along with the American requirement of sealed-beam headlamps, 5-mph bumpers, the body stampings are not shared between the two model line; for example, the joint between the roof and A-pillar on the American model line is welded together (on the European version, it is a single stamping). On the Omni/Horizon, the rear door windows do not roll down completely; the corresponding version of the Chrysler Horizon does (through a higher-cost, more complex design).

With the exception of grilles, taillamps, and model badging, the Dodge Omni and Plymouth Horizon were largely indistinguishable from one another. For 1984, the model line underwent a minor revision. Distinguished by revised exterior badging, the revision phased out a large degree of chrome exterior trim in favor of black-painted trim. The interior received a redesigned dashboard (a Rallye dashboard with full instrumentation was introduced as an option) and new seats; a 5-speed manual transmission became standard. For 1987, to streamline production, all vehicles received an instrument panel with tachometer, oil pressure, and voltmeter gauges.

For 1990, the Omni and Horizon underwent several minor revisions. Chrysler invested in a number of significant changes that ended up being used for only one year; the cars gained larger exterior rear-view mirrors borrowed from the departed M-body sedans in lieu of the original round units, and, to comply with federal passive-restraint regulations, a driver-side airbag was added along with rear-seat outboard shoulder belts. The instrument panel was mildly redesigned, complete with HVAC controls moved to the center, taking the place of the radio (which took the place of the ashtray).

Trim 
In contrast to many Chrysler model lines, the Dodge Omni and Plymouth Horizon were largely sold across a single trim level. For 1981 and 1982, Chrysler introduced a "Miser" version; this lightly-equipped version was developed to increase fuel economy, including an overdrive manual transmission.

For 1984, the SE (Sport Edition) option was introduced, which consisted of two-tone exterior paint. From 1984 to 1986, the Carroll Shelby Omni GLH, GLH-T, and GLHS (see below) were high-performance turbocharged versions of the Omni hatchback.

For 1987, the America edition of the Omni was introduced to combat recent low-priced imports such as the Yugo and the Hyundai Excel. The price was dropped from $6,209 to $5,499, with "$684 of added equipment at no cost" according to Chrysler. The break-even point of the Omni America was 170,000 cars To offer the vehicle as the lowest-price American-assembled subcompact, Chrysler reduced the number of options to two (air conditioning and a radio, three options if the California emissions package is included), while cutting the profit margin. Suppliers, United Auto Workers, Chrysler dealers, and even the State of Illinois also made concessions to help lower the price of the car.

Production 
From 1977 to 1990, Chrysler Corporation assembled the Omni and Horizon hatchbacks at Belvidere Assembly Plant (Belvidere, Illinois), which assembled the entire line of L-body vehicles, including the Dodge Omni 024, Plymouth Horizon TC3, Dodge Charger, Plymouth Turismo, Dodge Rampage, and Plymouth Scamp. The Omni and Horizon appeared at a critical time for Chrysler, when the company was on the brink of bankruptcy and sought government support to survive. However, the L-bodies miscarried at first, since 1978 was a year of strong sales for larger cars and demand for compacts and subcompacts noticeably shrank. These initial poor sales of the cars contributed to Chrysler's financial woes at the time, but when the company requested federal assistance, the Omni was an important piece of evidence that they were attempting to compete with imports and build small, fuel-efficient cars and might be worth saving. For the three years leading up to the introduction of Chrysler's K-cars, the Omni/Horizon was Chrysler's best selling model line.

In 1985, Chrysler entered an agreement with American Motors Corporation (AMC) to produce Chrysler M-body vehicles at its Kenosha, Wisconsin facility (supplementing AMC production of Renault-badged vehicles). Alongside production of Chrysler's M-body sedans (Dodge Diplomat/Plymouth Gran Fury/Chrysler Fifth Avenue), Chrysler and AMC agreed to add the L-body Omni and Horizon to the contract in 1987. M-body sedans were built at the Kenosha Main plant, while L-bodies were built at Kenosha Lakefront. 

Production Figures:

Variants
Following the introduction of the five-door Omni/Horizon, Chrysler introduced several additional versions of the L-body platform, including the Dodge 024/Plymouth TC3 three-door hatchbacks (later the Dodge Charger/Plymouth Turismo) and the Dodge Rampage/Plymouth Scamp coupé utility pickup truck.  

As a hot hatch, Chrysler introduced the turbocharged Omni GLH (later the Shelby GLH-S).

Dodge Omni 024/Dodge Charger 

For 1979, Chrysler introduced a hatchback coupe version of the Omni/Horizon, named the Dodge Omni 024 and Plymouth Horizon TC3. Using an L-body chassis (shortened to a 96.6-inch wheelbase), the 024/TC3 coupes shared no external bodywork with the five-door hatchbacks. Sharing the same powertrain as the Omni and Horizon, the coupes were largely designed for appearance over performance. After the 1982 model year, the 024/TC3 were discontinued.

For 1982, the Dodge Charger and Plymouth Turismo were introduced as gradual replacements for the 024/TC3. While again receiving the same powertrain offerings as the five-door hatchbacks, the 2.2 L high-output engine was added to create the Dodge Shelby Charger/Plymouth Turismo Duster. For 1984, the coupes received updated exterior styling (distinguished by a quad-headlamp front fascia). For 1985 and 1986, the Shelby Charger adopted the  engine of the Omni GLH-T.

Following the 1987 model year, the Dodge Charger/Plymouth Turismo were replaced by the Dodge Shadow/Plymouth Sundance; Dodge would not again remarket a Charger until the 2005 model year. The final 1000 Dodge Shelby Chargers were built as Shelby Charger GLHS vehicles with a  2.2 L Turbo II engine, upgraded transmission, brakes, and suspension, and the deletion of all Dodge badging.

Dodge Rampage/Plymouth Scamp 

For 1982, Chrysler introduced a coupe utility pickup derived from the L-body chassis, named the Dodge Rampage. The first front-wheel drive American pickup truck, the Rampage extended the Dodge Omni chassis to a 104.2-inch wheelbase. To compete with the payload of the larger El Camino, Chrysler redesigned the rear frame and suspension of the L-body for the Rampage, with the vehicle receiving a leaf-sprung rear axle.

For 1983 the Plymouth Scamp was introduced alongside the Dodge Rampage, distinguished primarily by badging and trim; the Scamp was offered only for 1983. For 1984, the Rampage received the quad-headlight front fascia of the Dodge Charger and block-letter badging.

Dodge Omni GLH

The highest-performance Dodge Omni was the 1984–1986 Omni GLH, modified by Carroll Shelby. Following the rejection of "Coyote" by Chrysler, the initials GLH ("Goes Like Hell", the choice of Carroll Shelby) were used instead.

For 1984, the Omni GLH adopted many of the modifications of the 1983 Shelby Charger, including its  2.2 L "high-output" I4, stiffer suspension, larger brakes and wider tires. For 1985 and 1986, Shelby offered the GLH with an optional  2.2 L Turbo I I4 (GLH-T); 1986 vehicles are largely distinguished by their center brake light.

Shelby GLH-S 

Shelby Automobiles purchased the final 500 1986 GLH-T (all in black) and used them as the basis for the 1986 Shelby GLHS ("Goes Like Hell S'more"). Modified by the company in California, the GLHS vehicles were legally sold as Shelbys. The Turbo I engine underwent extensive modification, adopting multiple components of what would become the Turbo II engine introduced for 1987. Along with an intercooler, the engine received a larger turbocharger and throttle body, tuned intake and exhaust manifolds, a new wiring harness, and a new radiator and engine fan (among other engine modifications). The suspension was upgraded further, receiving stiffer springs, and adjustable Koni struts and shocks, along with larger tires mounted on Shelby-designed wheels. In contrast to the red pinstripes of the GLH/GLH-T, the GLHS used silver pinstripes and badging; a "Shelby" decal was added to the windshield and a large GLHS decal was added to the driver-side C-pillar (the passenger-side C-pillar was occupied by the gas cap door).

Legacy 

At the time of its 1978 launch, the Omni and Horizon would play a significant role in the survival of Chrysler Corporation. While initially struggling against rebounding sales of larger vehicles, nearly 200,000 examples of the combined model line were sold in the first model year. In contrast to most Chrysler model lines, the Plymouth Horizon would outsell the Dodge Omni (some years, by a significant margin), with the exception of the final 1989 and 1990 model years.

As the Omni/Horizon became the best-selling Chrysler model line between 1978 and 1980, it would play a major role in Chrysler securing government funding in 1979. The model line was evidence that Chrysler was attempting to develop more fuel-efficient vehicles competitive with automakers around the world. Along with ensuring the continued survival of the company, the $1.5 billion loans allowed Chrysler to finish the development of its compact/mid-size K-Car program and its minivans, two of its most profitable model lines during the 1980s.

Awards 
Following its launch, the Dodge Omni was awarded the 1978 Motor Trend Car of the Year Award. In a similar fashion, the 1978 Chrysler Horizon was voted European Car of the Year for 1979.

Consumer Reports review 
Shortly after their introduction, Consumer Reports tested the Omni and Horizon and reported that it lost control in hard maneuvering. As front-wheel-drive cars were still considered a new idea in the American automotive industry, the allegation received extensive mainstream coverage, including a piece in Time magazine. Other automotive media reported no problems and said the Consumer Reports test did not approximate real-world driving conditions. In response to the Consumer Reports article, Chrysler modified the car to add a steering damper and a lighter-weight steering wheel.

References

External links

Allpar's Omni/Horizon page
Plymouth Horizon-o-Rama
Canadian Driver
Front-Runners.net Road Test (PDF)

Omni
Front-wheel-drive vehicles
Subcompact cars
Hatchbacks
1980s cars
1990s cars
Cars introduced in 1978